In probability theory and statistics, the generalized inverse Gaussian distribution (GIG)  is a three-parameter family of continuous probability distributions with probability density function

where Kp is a modified Bessel function of the second kind, a > 0, b > 0 and p a real parameter. It is used extensively in geostatistics, statistical linguistics, finance, etc. This distribution was first proposed by Étienne Halphen. 
It was rediscovered and popularised by Ole Barndorff-Nielsen, who called it the generalized inverse Gaussian distribution.  Its statistical properties are discussed in Bent Jørgensen's lecture notes.

Properties

Alternative parametrization

where  is the concentration parameter while  is the scaling parameter.

Summation 
Barndorff-Nielsen and Halgreen proved that the GIG distribution is infinitely divisible.

Entropy 
The entropy of the generalized inverse Gaussian distribution  is given as

 

where  is a derivative of the modified Bessel function of the second kind with respect to the order  evaluated at

Characteristic Function 
The characteristic of a random variable  is given as(for a derivation of the characteristic function, see supplementary materials of   ) 

 

for  where  denotes the imaginary number.

Related distributions

Special cases
The inverse Gaussian and gamma distributions are special cases of the generalized inverse Gaussian distribution for p = −1/2 and b = 0, respectively.  Specifically, an inverse Gaussian distribution of the form

 

A Gamma distribution of the form

 

Other special cases include the inverse-gamma distribution, for a = 0.

Conjugate prior for Gaussian
The GIG distribution is conjugate to the normal distribution when serving as the mixing distribution in a normal variance-mean mixture. Let the prior distribution for some hidden variable, say , be GIG:

and let there be  observed data points, with normal likelihood function, conditioned on 

 

where  is the normal distribution, with mean  and variance .

where .

Sichel distribution
The Sichel distribution results when the GIG is used as the mixing distribution for the Poisson parameter .

Notes

References

See also 
Inverse Gaussian distribution
Gamma distribution

Continuous distributions
Exponential family distributions